Paccha Duchicela (1485–1525), was a queen regnant of Quito in 1487–1525 and co-reigned with her husband Huayna Capac, the Emperor of Inca Empire. She was also a consort of the Inca Empire by marriage to the Sapa Inca Huayna Capac (r 1493–1527). She has been pointed out as the mother of Atahualpa.

Paccha Duchicela was the daughter of the Puruhá chief Cacha Duchicela of Quito in Ecuador. She was the heir of her father's throne, and when Quito became a vassal of the Inca Empire, she was married to the Inca emperor. Her right to the throne of Quito was thereby transferred to the royal Inca dynasty. She is reported to have had four children by the Inca; that she was the mother of Atahualpa is not confirmed.

References

Sources
 Avilés Pino, Efrén. «Paccha Duchicela, Shyri XVI». Enciclopedia del Ecuador.

Inca Empire people
15th-century births
1525 deaths
Nobility of the Americas
15th-century women rulers
16th-century women rulers